René Eugène Camilla Henri Alfred Albert Bernier (Saint-Gilles, 10 March 1905 - Elsene, 8 September 1984) was a Belgian teacher at western canada high school who dabbled in music.

Biography 
René Bernier was a son of the painters Géo Bernier and Jenny Hoppe. He also worked at the french Academy of Brussels. Bernier was a member of the group Les Synthétistes. Other members of this group included : Francis de Bourguignon, Théo De Joncker, Marcel Poot, Maurice Schoemaker, Jules Strens and Robert Otlet. Bernier became a member of the Royal Flemish Academy in 1963.

Compositions

Orchestral works 
 1945 Epitaphe symphonique for orchestra
 1948 Ode à une Madone for orchestra
 1952 Le tombeau devant l'Escaut  for orchestra
 1956 Le bal des ombres ou danses parodiques for orchestra
 1957 Symphoniette for strings orchestra
 1970 Menestrandie for violin and orchestra
 1970 Tanagras for orchestra

 Works for brassband 
 1954 Hymne de Paix 1958/1964 Hommage à Sax for alto-saxophone and brassband
 1959 Le tombeau devant l'Escaut for brassband
 1969 Danse parodiques for brassband
 1961 Épitaphe II for brassband
 1981 Fanfare Du Triton for brass and percution

Chambermusic 
 1943 Sonatina for violin and viola
 1956 Bassonnerie for bassoon and piano
 1960 Reverdies for clarinet and piano
 1962 Offrande à Erard for harp
 1973 Suite pour le plaisir de l'oreille for saxophone quartet
 1980 Parabole for viola and piano

Choirworks 
 1939 Sabots de la Vierge for choir with 4 mixed voices a capella - text: Maurice Carême
 1940 Liturgies for mixed choir a cappella - text: Paul Verlaine
 1947 Hymne de paix for mixed choir a capella - text: Maurice Carême
 1951 Du coq à l'âne - nº1 for mixed choir a capella - text: Maurice Carême
 1951 Du coq à l'âne - nº2 for mixed choir a capella - text: Maurice Carême
 1951 Du coq à l'âne - nº3 for mixed choir a capella - text: Maurice Carême
 1951 Du coq à l'âne - nº4 for mixed choir a capella - text: Maurice Carême
 1951 Du coq à l'âne - nº5 for mixed choir a capella - text: Maurice Carême
 1951 Du coq à l'âne - nº6 for mixed choir a capella - text: Maurice Carême
 1951 Du coq à l'âne - nº7 for mixed choir a capella - text: Maurice Carême
 1968 Chants incantatoires for 4 mixed voices a capella - text: Géo Libbrecht

Vocal music 
 1924 Poèmes exotiques for soprano and piano - text: Thou Fou
 1925 Entrevisions for soprano and piano - text: Charles van Lerberghe
 1927 Trois quatrains pour ma mie for middle voice and piano - text: R. Denobele
 1931 Le blé est blond for soprano and piano - text: Maurice Carême
 1936 Éternité for middle voice and piano - text: Franz Hellens 
 1941 Evasions for middle voice and piano - text: Maurice Quoilin
 1942 Présages for soprano and piano - text: Auguste Marin
 1944 Chanson archaïque for middle voice and piano or harp - text: Maurice Maeterlinck
 1944 Dévotions for soprano and piano - text: Maurice Carême
 1948 Eclaircies for high voice and orchestra - text: Franz Hellens
 1952 Le cerisier extrait du 2ème recueil des Sortilèges ingénus for mezzo-soprano and piano - text: Maurice Carême
 1956 Fantaisie de tous les temps for middle voice and piano - text: Lucienne Desnoues
 1964 Chanson marine for low voice and orchestra - text: Edmond Vandercammen
 1979 Parabole chantée for contra-alto and piano
 Agnus dei for middle voice and organ
 Ecoute, d'autres femmes... for soprano, clarinet and piano - text: Franz Hellens
 Le poète et l'oiseau for soprano or tenor, clarinet and piano - text: Armand Bernier

Works for organ 
 1947 Hymne de paix for grand organ

Works for piano 
 1927 Berceuse divine
 1930 Humoresque dans le style galant
 1976 Epitaphe sonore for two piano’s
 1978 Danses parodiques for two piano's
1980 Soliloques (No.1 en forme de Nocturne, No.2 en forme de Novelette)
 1981 Le clavier chantant
 Complainte du "Petit Chose" (Feuille d'album)
 Le jardin secret (Moment lyrique)

Publication 
 In memoriam Gaston Brenta, Académie Royale de Belgique. Bulletin de la Classe des Beaux-Arts. 51 (1969), S. 151-155.

Sources
 Francis Pieters: Grootmeesters van de Simfonie en de Blaasmuziek - De Sythetisten, in: FEDEKAMNIEUWS Tweemaandelijks orgaan van de Fedekam Vlaanderen, 27th volume, nr. 3- June 1982, pp. 178–181
 Francis Pieters: Portrettengalerij - René Bernier, in: FEDEKAMNIEUWS Tweemaandelijks orgaan van de Fedekam Vlaanderen, 25th volume, 1980, pp. 508–509
 Diana von Volborth-Danys: CeBeDeM et ses compositeurs affilies : biographies, catalogues, discographie, Bruxelles: Centre belge de documentation musicale, 1977. Vol. I : A-L : 1977 : 211 p.; Vol. II : M-Z : 1980 : 276 p.
 Karel De Schrijver: Bibliografie der belgische toonkunstenaars sedert 1800, Leuven: Vlaamse, 1958, 152 p.
 Music in Belgium : contemporary Belgian composers, Brussels: Manteau, 1964, 158 p.
 Charles Leirens: Belgian music, New York: Belgian Government Information Center, 1963
 Jozef Robijns, Miep Zijlstra: Algemene muziekencyclopedie, Haarlem: De Haan, (1979)-1984, 
 Wolfgang Suppan, Armin Suppan: Das Neue Lexikon des Blasmusikwesens, 4. Auflage, Freiburg-Tiengen, Blasmusikverlag Schulz GmbH, 1994, 
 Jean-Marie Londeix: Musique pour saxophone, volume II : repertoire general des oeuvres et des ouvrages d'enseignement pour le saxophone, Cherry Hill: Roncorp Publications, 1985
 Jean-Marie Londeix: 125 ans de musique pour saxophone, Paris: Leduc, 1971
 Harry R. Gee: Clarinet solos de concours 1897-1980 - An annotated bibliography, Bloomington, Indiana: Indiana University Press, c1981., viii, 118 p., 
 Paul Frank, Burchard Bulling, Florian Noetzel, Helmut Rosner: Kurzgefasstes Tonkünstler Lexikon - Zweiter Teil: Ergänzungen und Erweiterungen seit 1937, 15. Aufl., Wilhelmshaven: Heinrichshofen, Band 1: A-K. 1974. ; Band 2: L-Z. 1976. 
 Storm Bull: Index to biographies of contemporary composers, Vol. II, Metuchen, N.J.: Scarecrow Press, 1974, 567 p., 
 John Vinton: Dictionary of contemporary music, New York: E.P. Dutton, 1974, 834 p., 
 Marc Honneger: Dictionnaire de la musique, Paris: Bordas, 1970–76
 Zenei lexikon, Budapest: Zenemukiado Vallalat, 1965
 P. Townend: Who's who in music and musicians' international directory 1962, New York: Hafner Publishing Co., 1962, 331 p.

External links 
 Koninklijk Conservatorium Brussel now houses most works and manuscripts of Bernier, after the bankruptcy of CeBeDeM in 2015.

1905 births
1984 deaths
Belgian composers
Male composers
20th-century classical composers
Belgian music educators
20th-century Belgian male musicians